The women's individual pursuit at the UEC European Track Championships was first competed in 2014 in Guadeloupe, France.  Katie Archibald has dominated the event, winning its first four editions, before finally being pushed into silver in 2018 by Lisa Brennauer of Germany, the only other multiple champion in the event's history (2018 and 2021). The event from a national viewpoint has been entirely dominated by Germany and Great Britain, taking all of the first nine titles and over two-thirds of all available medals between them

Medalists

References

 
Women's individual pursuit
Women's individual pursuit